Jianye may refer to:

Jianye District, in Nanjing, Jiangsu, China
Jiankang, also known as Jianye, ancient city in China
Henan Jianye, Chinese football club